The 1969 All-Big Eight Conference football team consists of American football players chosen by various organizations for All-Big Eight Conference teams for the 1969 NCAA University Division football season.  The selectors for the 1969 season included the Associated Press (AP) and the United Press International (UPI).

Offensive selections

Tight ends
 Jim McFarland, Nebraska (AP)
 Steve Zabel, Oklahoma (UPI)

Split ends
 Mel Gray, Missouri (AP, UPI)

Tackles
 John Ward, Oklahoma State (AP, UPI)
 Larron Jackson, Missouri (AP, UPI)

Guards
 Dick Melvin, Colorado (AP, UPI)
 Ken Mendenhall, Oklahoma (AP)
 Bill Elfstrom, Oklahoma (UPI)

Centers
 Dale Evans, Kansas (AP, UPI))

Backs
 Lynn Dickey, Kansas State (AP, UPI)
 Steve Owens, Oklahoma (AP, UPI)
 Mack Herron, Kansas State (AP, UPI)
 Bob Anderson, Colorado (AP, UPI)

Defensive selections

Defensive ends
 M. Barrera, Kansas State (AP, UPI)
 Bill Brundige, Colorado (AP, UPI)

Defensive tackles
 John Little, Oklahoma State (AP, UPI)
 Jerry Sherk, Oklahoma State (AP)
 M. Kuhlman, Missouri (UPI)

Middle guards
 John Stucky, Kansas State (AP, UPI)

Linebackers
 Ken Geddes, Nebraska (AP, UPI)
 Emery Hicks, Kansas (AP, UPI)
 Jerry Murtaugh, Nebraska (AP, UPI)

Defensive backs
 Dana Stephenson, Nebraska (AP, UPI)
 Tony Washington, Iowa State (AP, UPI)
 Dennis Poppe, Missouri (AP, UPI)

Key

AP = Associated Press

UPI = United Press International

See also
 1969 College Football All-America Team

References

All-Big Seven Conference football team
All-Big Eight Conference football teams